Haanja Upland (also Haanja Highland) is a hilly area of higher elevation in southern Estonia. It contains the highest point of Estonia, Suur Munamägi.

The upland continues into the neighboring Latvia as the Alūksne Upland.

References

Hills of Estonia
Landforms of Võru County